An ethnonym is the name applied to a given ethnic group. Ethnonyms can be divided into two categories: exonyms (where the name of the ethnic group has been created by another group of people) and autonyms or endonyms (self-designation; where the name is created and used by the ethnic group itself).
This article does not cover ethnic slurs.

List

Obsolete 
Jews were often called (and occasionally called themselves) Palestinians, but after the emergence of Arab Palestinian nationalism and the establishment of the State of Israel in 1948, the term "Palestinians" came to be used almost exclusively for Palestinian Arabs. (See Definitions of Palestinian)

See also
 Jew (word)
 Person of Jewish ethnicity

Footnotes 
1 Ioudaios, Yehudi, Jewish, a "Judaean", "from the land of Yehuda (Judah, Judea)".
2 Ivri, Hebrew, "one who passes over", a reference to the Biblical patriarch Abraham (or possibly Eber).
3 Israel, "one who has struggled with God", the name given to the Biblical patriarch Jacob.

References

Jewish
Ethnonyms